Department of School and Higher Education is the department of school education including primary and secondary schools in the state of West Bengal, India. This is the main authority to implement the educational policy of the Government of West Bengal.

Activities 
The department is the nodal body which look after various aspects of school level educations for the state having specific tasks like text book selection, formation of board and councils (West Bengal Board of Secondary Education and West Bengal Council of Higher Secondary Education), inspection, recruitment of teachers (Government)/ education staff, execution of projects, language policy and schemes, preparation of teaching, training, research etc. There are also have the regular budgeting, audit programs, recognition, up-gradation of schools and legal matters.

Ministers 
At present the Minister-in-Charge of this Department is Mr. Bratya Basu.

External links
 Board of School Education, West Bengal official website
 Council of Higher Secondary Education, West Bengal official website
 Department of School Education West Bengal [Banglar Shiksha] official website

References 

Government departments of West Bengal
West Bengal